The 2006 ISSF World Cup was held in the fifteen Olympic shooting events. Four qualification events were held in each event, spanning from March to June, and the best shooters qualified for the ISSF World Cup Final in Granada, Spain in October. It was the first time in the history of the competition that the finals in all events were held at a single venue.

During the final in Granada, while defending her title in the women's Air Rifle competition, Chinese Du Li equalled the world record with a perfect 400 score, becoming the second woman in the world to achieve this for a second time. Also in the men's Air Rifle, Thomas Farnik of Austria set a new final world record with 703.1.

Alexei Klimov bettered the world record in 25 m Rapid Fire Pistol from 589 to 591 and won narrowly after losing most of his pre-final advantage.

In men's Trap, Czech David Kostelecky equalled the perfect world record of 125, but missed three targets in the final and eventually lost to Olympic and European champion Aleksei Alipov on shoot-off; both shooters also equalled the final world record.

Winners

Triple winners 
  (RFP)
  (SP and AP40)
  (FR60PR)

Double winners 
  (FP and AP60)
  (TR75)
  (SP and AP40)
  (AR60)
  (TR125)
  (SP)
  (DT150)
  (FR3X40 and AR60)
  (AR40)

See also 
 2006 ISSF World Shooting Championships
 Shooting at the 2008 Summer Olympics – Qualification

External links 
 Full results at ISSF TV

References 

ISSF World Cup
World Cup
2006 in Spanish sport
Sport in Granada
Shooting competitions in Spain